Maurice "Maury" Meyers (April 16, 1932 – June 15, 2014) was an American politician who served four non-consecutive terms (1978–1980, 1980–1982, 1986–1988 and 1988–1990) as Mayor of Beaumont, Texas. He is well known in the city as a progressive and economic mind, help turning the city of Beaumont into a thriving community. Maury also led the charge to desegregate the school systems in Beaumont while in office. He again though about running for mayor in the early 2000s to rejuvenate the city back to promise, when his battle with Parkinson's disease made it unsafe to himself to do so. The same Parkinson's disease is what took him from the city in June 2014, and he is remembered by his wife Arline, his son Casey, four daughters, Ellen, Peggy, Nancy and Jamie.

See also
 List of mayors of Beaumont, Texas

References

1932 births
2014 deaths
Deaths from Parkinson's disease
Neurological disease deaths in Texas
Mayors of places in Texas
People from Beaumont, Texas
People from New York (state)